Arasht or Arisht or Arshet or Arshit or Aresht may refer to:

Arasht, Qazvin
Arasht, Zanjan